Mansa is one of the 182 Legislative Assembly constituencies of Gujarat state in India. It is part of Gandhinagar district and it came into existence after 2008 delimitation.

List of segments

This assembly seat represents the following segments,

 Mansa Taluka
 Kalol Taluka (Part) Villages – Veda-Himmatpura, Jamla, Vagosana, Dhendhu, Sobhasan, Itla, Limbodara, Aluva, Mubarakpura, Balva-Rampura, Pratappura – 1, Chandisana, Amaja, Nadri, Soja, Paliyad, Khorajdabhi

Members of Legislative Assembly
2007 - Prof. Mangaldas Patel, Bharatiya Janata Party
2012 - Amitbhai Chaudhari, Indian National Congress

Election results

2022

2017

2012

See also
 List of constituencies of the Gujarat Legislative Assembly
 Gandhinagar district

References

External links
 

Assembly constituencies of Gujarat
Gandhinagar district